Mancinella capensis is a species of sea snail, a marine gastropod mollusk, in the family Muricidae, the murex snails or rock snails.

References

 Petit de la Saussaye, S., 1852. - Description de coquilles nouvelles. Journal de Conchyliologie 3: 162-165
 Fischer-Piette, E., 1950. - Listes des types décrits dans le Journal de Conchyliologie et conservés dans la collection de ce journal. Journal de Conchyliologie 90: 8-23
 Turton W.H. (1932). Marine Shells of Port Alfred, S. Africa. Humphrey Milford, London, xvi + 331 pp., 70 pls. page(s): 77, pl. 18, sp. 556.
 Claremont M., Vermeij G.J., Williams S.T. & Reid D.G. (2013) Global phylogeny and new classification of the Rapaninae (Gastropoda: Muricidae), dominant molluscan predators on tropical rocky seashores. Molecular Phylogenetics and Evolution 66: 91–102

External links
 MNHN, Paris: paratype

capensis
Gastropods described in 1852